Bruno Langlois (born March 1, 1979) is a Canadian former racing cyclist.

Career
Born in Matane, Quebec, Langlois began his professional career in 1999 with the Jet Fuel Coffee – Vitasoy cycling team. In 2012, along with directeur sportif Phil Cortes, Langlois rode for Canadian cycling team , ranking second in the final general classification of the Tour de Guadeloupe. He was ranked as the best climber in a UCI World Tour one day race in his home country, the Grand Prix Cycliste de Québec, a very hilly course.

Major results

2006
 1st Overall Tobago International
1st Stage 3
 1st Stage 5 Tour de Shenandoah
 1st Stage 2 Tri-Peaks Challenge
2008
 2nd Road race, National Road Championships
 2nd Overall Tour de Québec
 3rd Overall Classique Montréal-Québec Louis Garneau
2010
 1st Stage 2 Tour de Québec
 2nd Overall Vuelta a la Independencia Nacional
1st Stage 1
 3rd Road race, National Road Championships
2011
 1st Overall Tour de Québec
1st Stages 2 & 3
 6th Tro-Bro Léon
2012
 1st Stage 6 Tour de Beauce
 Tour du Rwanda
1st Stages 4 & 8
 2nd Overall Tour de Québec
1st Stages 2 & 5
 2nd Overall Tour de Guadeloupe
1st Stage 6
 8th Overall Vuelta a la Independencia Nacional
1st Stages 7 & 8b (ITT)
 9th Tour of the Battenkill
2013
 3rd Overall Vuelta a la Independencia Nacional
1st Stage 6b
2014
 8th Winston-Salem Cycling Classic
2015
 Grand Prix Cycliste de Saguenay
1st  Mountains classification
1st Stages 2 & 4
2016
 1st  Road race, National Road Championships
 2nd White Spot / Delta Road Race
2017
 3rd Winston-Salem Cycling Classic
 8th Overall Tour de Beauce
 9th Overall Grand Prix Cycliste de Saguenay
2018
 6th Overall Tour de Guadeloupe
1st Stage 3

References

External links

BL Coaching
Bruno Langlois' profile on Cyclingbase.com

1979 births
Canadian male cyclists
Cyclists from Quebec
French Quebecers
Living people
People from Matane
Tour de Guadeloupe stage winners